El Ancer is a district in Jijel Province, Algeria. It was named after its capital, El Ancer.

Municipalities
The district is further divided into 4 municipalities:
Bouraoui Belhadef
Djemaa Beni Habibi
El Ancer
Kheïri Oued Adjoul